Ron Stander (October 17, 1944 – March 8, 2022) was an American professional boxer, who fought from 1969 to 1982. The highlight of Stander's pro career came on May 25, 1972 when he challenged for the world heavyweight championship in Omaha, Nebraska.  Stander lost to champion Joe Frazier by fifth-round technical knockout when the ring doctor stopped the fight after the fourth round. Prior to his unsuccessful match versus Frazier, Stander had  scored a fifth-round knockout victory over hard-punching Earnie Shavers in 1970, and a decision win over contender Thad Spencer in 1971. An award-winning documentary titled "The Bluffs Butcher," after his adopted hometown of Council Bluffs, Iowa, produced by journalism student Andrew Batt, was released in 2004. The documentary tells the story of Iowa's arguably best shot at a World Heavyweight Boxing Title and chronicled Stander's journey from virtual unknown to boxing's largest stage.

Frazier-Stander Fight
Stander was largely an unknown commodity when he was given the opportunity to fight for the world heavyweight title in Omaha. The fight prompted Stander's then wife Darlene Stander, to famously compare it to putting a Volkswagen to compete at the Indianapolis 500 race, when she said "You don't take a Volkswagen into the Indy 500, unless you know of a hell of a shortcut". It marked the first time a world heavyweight title fight had been held in Nebraska.  Stander had a solid 23-1-1 record entering the bout and was clearly the fans' favorite based on the huge, enthusiastic ovation he received when he was introduced.  Frazier was the undefeated champion and entered the ring as a 10-1 betting favorite.  He was booed after being introduced.  Both men employed the same aggressive fighting style of pushing forward and fighting at close quarters, which made for an exciting contest.  Stander was quite competitive in the first round, even buckling Frazier's knees with one blow late in the round.  However, by the second round, Frazier's superiority in class began to show and the champion was getting the better of the frequent exchanges.  In the third round Frazier opened a cut on the bridge of Stander's nose and severely staggered him late in the round.  Stander was not knocked down, however.  By the fourth round Stander was bleeding profusely from the cut and again was badly staggered towards the end of the round as Frazier landed numerous telling blows to Stander's face.  Between rounds four and five the fight was stopped by veteran referee Zack Clayton on the advice of the ring doctor.  Officially Frazier was credited with a victory by a fifth-round technical knockout.

Personal life and death
Stander died from complications of diabetes on March 8, 2022, at the age of 77.

Professional boxing record

|-
|align="center" colspan=8|38 Wins (29 knockouts, 9 decisions), 21 Losses (9 knockouts, 12 decisions), 3 Draws
|-
| align="center" style="border-style: none none solid solid; background: #e3e3e3"|Result
| align="center" style="border-style: none none solid solid; background: #e3e3e3"|Record
| align="center" style="border-style: none none solid solid; background: #e3e3e3"|Opponent
| align="center" style="border-style: none none solid solid; background: #e3e3e3"|Type
| align="center" style="border-style: none none solid solid; background: #e3e3e3"|Round
| align="center" style="border-style: none none solid solid; background: #e3e3e3"|Date
| align="center" style="border-style: none none solid solid; background: #e3e3e3"|Location
| align="center" style="border-style: none none solid solid; background: #e3e3e3"|Notes
|-align=center
|Loss
|38–21–3
|align=left| Otis Bates
|PTS
|10
|July 6, 1982
|align=left| Little Rock, Arkansas, U.S.
|align=left|
|-
|Loss
|38–20–3
|align=left| Les Myers
|TKO
|6
|October 24, 1981
|align=left| Dodge City, Kansas, U.S.
|
|-
|Loss
|38–19–3
|align=left| Jeff May
|UD
|4
|June 25, 1981
|align=left| Milwaukee, Wisconsin, U.S.
|align=left|
|-
|Draw
|38–18–3
|align=left| Otis Bates
|PTS
|10
|July 27, 1980
|align=left| Omaha, Nebraska, U.S.
|align=left|
|-
|Loss
|38–18–2
|align=left| Jeff Shelburg
|PTS
|10
|May 24, 1980
|align=left| Salt Lake City, Utah, U.S.
|align=left|
|-
|Loss
|38–17–2
|align=left| James Tillis
|TKO
|7
|March 3, 1980
|align=left| Chicago, Illinois, U.S.
|
|-
|Loss
|38–16–2
|align=left| Scott Frank
|TKO
|1
|January 8, 1980
|align=left| Totowa, New Jersey, U.S.
|
|-
|Loss
|38–15–2
|align=left| Tom Fischer
|PTS
|10
|August 24, 1979
|align=left| Cincinnati, Ohio, U.S.
|align=left|
|-
|Win
|38–14–2
|align=left| Jim Pearish
|TKO
|5
|August 16, 1979
|align=left| North Platte, Nebraska, U.S.
|align=left|
|-
|Loss
|37–14–2
|align=left| James Dixon
|UD
|12
|June 25, 1979
|align=left| Omaha, Nebraska, U.S.
|align=left|
|-
|Loss
|37–13–2
|align=left| James Dixon
|UD
|10
|April 28, 1979
|align=left| Omaha, Nebraska, U.S.
|align=left|
|-
|Win
|37–12–2
|align=left| Rick Howe
|TKO
|5
|April 3, 1979
|align=left| Marshalltown, Iowa, U.S.
|align=left|
|-
|Win
|36–12–2
|align=left| Charles Atlas
|KO
|1
|November 29, 1978
|align=left| Council Bluffs, Iowa, U.S.
|align=left|
|-
|Win
|35–12–2
|align=left| Charley Polite
|UD
|10
|October 25, 1978
|align=left| Omaha, Nebraska, U.S.
|align=left|
|-
|Win
|34–12–2
|align=left| Bill Jackson
|KO
|1
|July 26, 1978
|align=left| Omaha, Nebraska, U.S.
|align=left|
|-
|Win
|33–12–2
|align=left| Jesus Montes
|KO
|3
|June 20, 1978
|align=left| Little Rock, Arkansas, U.S.
|align=left|
|-
|Win
|32–12–2
|align=left| Clyde Mudgett
|TKO
|4
|March 23, 1978
|align=left| Omaha, Nebraska, U.S.
|align=left|
|-
|Loss
|31–12–2
|align=left| Horace Robinson
|KO
|5
|November 30, 1977
|align=left| White Plains, New York, U.S.
|align=left|
|-
|Win
|31–11–2
|align=left| Raul Hernandez
|KO
|4
|November 15, 1977
|align=left| Oklahoma City, Oklahoma, U.S.
|align=left|
|-
|Loss
|30–11–2
|align=left| Boone Kirkman
|TKO
|7
|July 19, 1977
|align=left| Seattle, Washington, U.S.
|align=left|
|-
|Loss
|30–10–2
|align=left| Gerrie Coetzee
|KO
|8
|July 17, 1976
|align=left| Johannesburg, South Africa
|align=left|
|-
|Win
|30–9–2
|align=left| Beau Williford
|KO
|3
|June 1, 1976
|align=left| Oklahoma City, Oklahoma, U.S.
|align=left|
|-
|Loss
|29–9–2
|align=left| Ken Norton
|TKO
|5
|April 30, 1976
|align=left| Landover, Maryland, U.S.
|
|-
|Win
|29–8–2
|align=left| Jesus Montes
|KO
|3
|January 26, 1976
|align=left| Little Rock, Arkansas, U.S.
|align=left|
|-
|Win
|28–8–2
|align=left| Willie Jackson
|KO
|1
|January 6, 1976
|align=left| Oklahoma City, Oklahoma, U.S.
|align=left|
|-
|Loss
|27–8–2
|align=left| Scott LeDoux
|UD
|10
|December 10, 1975
|align=left| Bloomington, Minnesota, U.S.
|align=left|
|-
|Win
|27–7–2
|align=left| Terry Daniels
|TKO
|1
|November 20, 1975
|align=left| Omaha, Nebraska, U.S.
|align=left|
|-
|Win
|26–7–2
|align=left| Morris Jackson
|TKO
|2
|September 4, 1975
|align=left| Omaha, Nebraska, U.S.
|align=left|
|-
|Win
|25–7–2
|align=left| Bruce Scott
|TKO
|2
|August 5, 1975
|align=left| Oklahoma City, Oklahoma, U.S.
|
|-
|Loss
|24–7–2
|align=left| Fred Askew
|UD
|10
|May 7, 1975
|align=left| Minneapolis, Minnesota, U.S.
|align=left|
|-
|Loss
|24–6–2
|align=left| Rodney Bobick
|UD
|10
|July 31, 1974
|align=left| Bloomington, Minnesota, U.S.
|align=left|
|-
|Draw
|24–5–2
|align=left| Morris Jackson
|PTS
|10
|March 22, 1974
|align=left| Omaha, Nebraska, U.S.
|align=left|
|-
|Loss
|24–5–1
|align=left| Charlie James
|PTS
|10
|February 19, 1974
|align=left| Honolulu, Hawaii, U.S.
|align=left|
|-
|Loss
|24–4–1
|align=left| Jeff Merritt
|TKO
|3
|November 28, 1973
|align=left| Cleveland, Ohio, U.S.
|
|-
|Win
|24–3–1
|align=left| Walker Smith
|TKO
|3
|September 10, 1973
|align=left| Providence, Rhode Island, U.S.
|align=left|
|-
|Loss
|23–3–1
|align=left| John Jordan
|UD
|10
|March 29, 1973
|align=left| Portland, Maine, U.S.
|align=left|
|-
|Loss
|23–2–1
|align=left| Joe Frazier
|TKO
|5
|May 25, 1972
|align=left| Omaha, Nebraska, U.S.
|align=left|
|-
|Win
|23–1–1
|align=left| Johnny Mac
|UD
|10
|March 20, 1972
|align=left| Council Bluffs, Iowa, U.S.
|align=left|
|-
|Win
|22–1–1
|align=left| Mike Boswell
|UD
|10
|February 14, 1972
|align=left| Omaha, Nebraska, U.S.
|
|-
|Loss
|21–1–1
|align=left| Rico Brooks
|SD
|10
|January 22, 1972
|align=left| Denver, Colorado, U.S.
|
|-
|Win
|21–0–1
|align=left| Clyde Brown
|TKO
|3
|December 20, 1971
|align=left| Elgin, Illinois, U.S.
|
|-
|Win
|20–0–1
|align=left| Jesse Crown
|KO
|3
|October 26, 1971
|align=left| Omaha, Nebraska, U.S.
|
|-
|Win
|19–0–1
|align=left| Manuel Ramos
|UD
|10
|August 26, 1971
|align=left| Omaha, Nebraska, U.S.
|
|-
|Win
|18–0–1
|align=left| Jack O'Halloran
|UD
|10
|July 29, 1971
|align=left| Omaha, Nebraska, U.S.
|
|-
|Win
|17–0–1
|align=left| Lee Carr
|KO
|6
|May 24, 1971
|align=left| Omaha, Nebraska, U.S.
|
|-
|Win
|16–0–1
|align=left| Thad Spencer
|UD
|10
|April 23, 1971
|align=left| Omaha, Nebraska, U.S.
|
|-
|Win
|15–0–1
|align=left| Frank Bullard
|KO
|6
|March 30, 1971
|align=left| Omaha, Nebraska, U.S.
|
|-
|Win
|14–0–1
|align=left| Joe Murphy Goodwin
|KO
|1
|November 3, 1970
|align=left| Oklahoma City, Oklahoma, U.S.
|
|-
| Draw
|13–0–1
|align=left| Manuel Ramos
|PTS
|10
|September 17, 1970
|align=left| Omaha, Nebraska, U.S.
|
|-
|Win
|13–0
|align=left| Bill Hardney
|KO
|1
|August 28, 1970
|align=left| Omaha, Nebraska, U.S.
|
|-
|Win
|12–0
|align=left| Ray Ellis
|TKO
|3
|July 17, 1970
|align=left| Omaha, Nebraska, U.S.
|
|-
|Win
|11–0
|align=left| Eddie Dembry
|UD
|8
|June 8, 1970
|align=left| Omaha, Nebraska, U.S.
|
|-
|Win
|10–0
|align=left| Earnie Shavers
|KO
|5
|May 11, 1970
|align=left| Omaha, Nebraska, U.S.
|
|-
|Win
|9–0
|align=left| Woody Parks
|TKO
|1
|April 9, 1970
|align=left| Omaha, Nebraska, U.S.
|
|-
|Win
|8–0
|align=left| Joe Harris
|KO
|4
|March 23, 1970
|align=left| Milwaukee, Wisconsin, U.S.
|
|-
|Win
|7–0
|align=left| Lee Powell
|KO
|1
|March 2, 1970
|align=left| Omaha, Nebraska, U.S.
|
|-
|Win
|6–0
|align=left| Roy Rodriguez
|UD
|6
|January 29, 1970
|align=left| Waterloo, Iowa, U.S.
|
|-
|Win
|5–0
|align=left| Joe Byrd
|PTS
|6
|December 19, 1969
|align=left| Omaha, Nebraska, U.S.
|
|-
|Win
|4–0
|align=left| Wilbert Elbert
|KO
|1
|November 17, 1969
|align=left| Omaha, Nebraska, U.S.
|
|-
|Win
|3–0
|align=left| Lee Estes
|TKO
|2
|September 29, 1969
|align=left| Milwaukee, Wisconsin, U.S.
|
|-
|Win
|2–0
|align=left| Red Ferris
|KO
|1
|August 15, 1969
|align=left| Sioux Falls, South Dakota, U.S.
|
|-
|Win
|1–0
|align=left| Bobby Street
|KO
|1
|August 7, 1969
|align=left| Milwaukee, Wisconsin, U.S.
|
|}

References

External links
 

1944 births
2022 deaths
American male boxers
Heavyweight boxers
Sportspeople from Columbia, South Carolina
Deaths from diabetes
Place of death missing